Chudomir Cove is the 4.3 km wide cove indenting for 3.4 km the southeast coast of Trinity Peninsula, Antarctic Peninsula, and entered southwest of Pitt Point and northeast of Kiten Point.

The cove is named after the Bulgarian writer Chudomir (Dimitar Chorbadzhiyski, 1890–1967).

Location
German-British mapping in 1996.

Maps
 Trinity Peninsula. Scale 1:250000 topographic map No. 5697. Institut für Angewandte Geodäsie and British Antarctic Survey, 1996.
 Antarctic Digital Database (ADD). Scale 1:250000 topographic map of Antarctica. Scientific Committee on Antarctic Research (SCAR). Since 1993, regularly upgraded and updated.

References
 Bulgarian Antarctic Gazetteer. Antarctic Place-names Commission. (details in Bulgarian, basic data in English)
 Chudomir Cove. SCAR Composite Antarctic Gazetteer

External links
 Chudomir Cove. Copernix satellite image

Coves of Graham Land
Landforms of Trinity Peninsula
Bulgaria and the Antarctic